Bizarre is a Canadian sketch comedy television series that aired from 1980 to 1986. The show was hosted by John Byner and produced by CTV at the CFTO's Glen Warren Studios in the Toronto suburb of Scarborough, Ontario for first-run airing in Canada on CTV and in the United States on the Showtime premium cable network.

Synopsis

The series featured slapstick sketches, monologues, TV parodies, and performances by guest stand-up comics. Byner's interactions with members of the studio audience, or with show producer Bob Einstein (who often came in to halt a sketch midway through), provided an early example of removing the fourth wall. Much of the humour on the show was considered risqué during the original run of the series.

The series utilized a rotating ensemble of supporting actors who backed Byner up in his sketches. Besides Einstein, this group included Philip Akin, Harvey Atkin, Billy Barty, Cynthia Belliveau, Jack Duffy, Jayne Eastwood, Barbara Hamilton, John Hemphill, Barry Flatman, Keith Knight, Don Lake, Kathleen Laskey, Kate Lynch, Pat Morita, Debra McGrath, Mike Myers, Earl Pennington, Melissa Steinberg, Billy Van, Steve Weston, and Wayne and Shuster alumnus Tom Harvey.

Bizarre had guest star performers during its run including Steve Allen, Frances Bay, Redd Foxx, Luba Goy (who was concurrently with the Royal Canadian Air Farce, at that time primarily a radio troupe), Victoria Jackson, Murray Langston (as The Unknown Comic), Howie Mandel, Second City alumnus Dave Thomas, Willie Tyler & Lester, Marc Weiner, Henny Youngman and others.

Super Dave Osborne
A regular feature of the show was Super Dave Osborne (a spoof of daredevils such as Evel Knievel), portrayed by Bob Einstein, in which Super Dave would perform elaborate mock stunts meant to enthrall viewers; a reporter (usually Mike Walden) would assist in framing the sketch. Inevitably, the stunt would fail spectacularly, resulting in severe injury to Super Dave. These sketches would usually finish with a view of the scene, in which Super Dave was buried, encased, launched etc., as appropriate for the sketch. Meanwhile, feigning agony, Super Dave would discuss sundry details – information about the next show, why the stunt failed, or what he'd do to the reporter once he recovered from his injuries.

One notable Super Dave sketch was a stunt where he attempted to avoid being harmed while standing under a pile driver, by repeating the nonsense phrase "balloon ball".  The stunt failed in typical Super Dave style, leaving him as a helmeted head atop two shoes.  This particular sketch was popular enough that during the following season, Showtime ads for Bizarre featured a cartoon logo of Super Dave's helmeted head and shoes.

The Super Dave sketches led to a spin-off series (Super Dave) with a more family-friendly style.

Content editing
Two versions of the show were produced: episodes that aired on the Showtime cable network in the United States contained nudity and coarse language. The versions that aired on CTV (and later in syndication) had the nudity removed and the language bleeped by a horn-honking sound. Although the "adult" version is most closely associated with Showtime, it did go out on a few independent TV stations during the 1980s, playing as late-night fare, although the "clean" version is the one that was more commonly found in syndication. Current Canadian broadcast content regulations, which are more lenient than those of the 1980s, might permit the broadcast of the uncensored Showtime versions, but they have not been offered for broadcast syndication.

The "adult" version was also shown regionally on ITV in the United Kingdom, usually airing after 11 PM and with some of the more extreme language bleeped out conventionally.

Sketches containing nudity were censored for Canadian television and syndication by the inclusion of reverse angle scenes originally filmed from behind nude actors (generally women baring their breasts) or else alternate scenes that had been filmed with the models wearing a bra. Rare scenes involving a woman being naked below the waist, however, just had the skits end very abruptly.

The "adult" version has not aired on television since the Showtime airings and original syndication ceased in the late 1980s. The syndicated episodes have been rebroadcast since.

Development
Bizarre was originally developed for ABC. In 1979, ABC was looking into re-entering the late night television field amid reports of Johnny Carson potentially leaving NBC's The Tonight Show due to a contract dispute. ABC made overtures to Carson and to Richard Dawson, then working for ABC as the host of their daytime game show Family Feud and also serving as Carson's regular guest host. Carson eventually renewed with NBC.

Dawson taped the pilot for Bizarre at Television City Studios in Hollywood. The special aired on ABC March 20, 1979. Ultimately, neither Dawson nor ABC decided to continue with the project (ABC instead went with Fridays and Nightline). Production moved to Canada (allowing the show to qualify for Canadian content credits, despite maintaining a mostly American cast) and impressionist John Byner was installed as host. The premiere of Bizarre used many of the same sketches as the Dawson pilot.

DVD release
DVDs of the unedited version, titled The Best of Bizarre Uncensored, were released in late 2005 from Canadian video label Visual Entertainment and are available to buy from Canadian and US retailers.  Nine individual volumes have been released as of July 2007.

While the episodes appear to be uncensored regarding language and nudity, most are missing their original end credits, which included plugs for the Royal York Hotel in Toronto and Tilden Rent-a-Car. The only episodes to retain their original end credits are ones where live-action sketches are still taking place while the credits roll, and most of those episodes have the sponsorship plugs removed, with the exception of episode 47 (on Volume Five), due to Super Dave Osborne commenting on the plugs. A generic "DVD credits" roll appears on each disc to give credit to the people who worked on the show.

Reruns

The "adult" version has not aired on television since the Showtime airings and original syndication ceased in the late 1980s. The syndicated episodes have been rebroadcast since then in Canada (at least as recently as 2003), where they were mostly scheduled to fulfill "Canadian Content" requirements.

The Comedy Network aired Bizarre from 1997 to 2003.
TV Land Canada, later known as Comedy Gold, aired Bizarre from New Year's Eve 2008 to August 2011.

References

External links
 

1980s Canadian sketch comedy television series
1980 Canadian television series debuts
1986 Canadian television series endings
CTV Television Network original programming
English-language television shows
Showtime (TV network) original programming
Television shows filmed in Toronto
Television series by Glen-Warren Productions